"All You" is a 2012 single by The Cataracs featuring rapper Waka Flocka Flame and house music producer Kaskade. The chorus is sampled from the Kaskade track of the same name from his 2006 album, Love Mysterious. The song was also included in The Cataracs' 2012 EP Gordo Taqueria.

Music video
The music video was published to YouTube through The Cataracs' VEVO channel on May 25, 2012 and is five minutes and fifty-three seconds long.

Charts

References

2012 singles
2012 songs
Waka Flocka Flame songs
Kaskade songs
The Cataracs songs
Song recordings produced by the Cataracs
Songs written by Kshmr
Songs written by David Singer-Vine
Songs written by Kaskade
Universal Republic Records singles
Songs written by Waka Flocka Flame
Songs written by Finn Bjarnson